I'm Coming may refer to:

 "I'm Coming" (Rain song), 2006
 "I'm Coming" (Tove Lo song), 2020
 "I'm Coming (Tarzan Part 2)", a 2012 song by Dappy
 I'm Coming, a 1996 album by Szhirley (Danish singer)